Naiden Borichev (born 7 January 1980 in Sofia) is a Bulgarian former competitive figure skater. He is the 2003 Ondrej Nepela Memorial champion and a two-time Bulgarian national champion (2007 and 2008). He was coached by Evelina Panova and then coached himself. He also coached his teammate, Hristina Vassileva.

Programs

Results

References

External links
 

Bulgarian male single skaters
Living people
1980 births
Figure skaters from Sofia
Competitors at the 1999 Winter Universiade